"Sit! Stay! Wait! Down! / Love Story" is an extended play (marketed as a single) by Japanese recording artist Namie Amuro from her tenth studio album and debut bilingual album Uncontrolled (2012). The EP contains the songs "Sit! Stay! Wait! Down!" and "Love Story" from the parent album and two new tracks "Higher" and "Arigatou". The EP was produced by Michico, T. Kura, Miriam Nervo, Olivia Nervo, T-SK, Tesung Kim, and Nao'ymt, and is divided into two dance-pop songs and two pop ballads.

Sit! Stay! Wait! Down!/Love Story was released on December 7, 2011 through Avex Trax and received positive reviews from most music critics; many highlighted Amuro's vocals and the B-side "Higher", while some felt the rest of the songs were boring and outdated. Charted as a single on the Oricon Singles Chart, it reached number three and was certified gold by the Recording Industry Association of Japan (RIAJ). "Sit! Stay! Wait! Down!" and "Love Story" were released as the two lead singles and charted on the Japan Hot 100 at three and two, respectively.

Background
Sit! Stay! Wait! Down!/Love Story features two lead singles "Sit! Stay! Wait! Down!" and "Love Story" and two unreleased tracks "Higher" and "Arigatou". "Sit! Stay! Wait! Down!" and "Arigatou" were written by Michico and co-produced by T.kura, "Love Story" was written by Tiger and produced by T-SK, Tesung Kim and Nervo, and Japanese record producer Nao'ymt produced and wrote "Higher". "Love Story" was used as a theme song for the drama series Watashi Ga Renai Dekinai Riyuu. "Arigatou" was used as the theme song for Kose's Esprique TV commercial. "Higher" was performed on her Namie Amuro Live Style 2014 Japan arena tour.

Critical reception
Sit! Stay! Wait! Down!/Love Story received positive reviews from most music critics. David Cirone from J-Generation labelled the first single "sexy" and "tongue-in-cheek", while he commented on the latter single ""Love Story" are great ballads, featuring flawless and sincere vocals, just as memorable as some of the greats on Best Fiction." Cirone highlighted "Love Story" as a stand out from Uncontrolled. CDJournal.com praised the first two singles for its composition, calling "Sit! Stay! Wait! Down!" full of tension and "humorous" and liking Amuro's painful and sad vocals on "Love Story". The website also commended the latter two tracks, labelling "Higher" "full of tension" and a "thrilling electropop song" while calling "Arigatou" "beautiful".

However, Michael McCarthy from Otakudx.com had overall criticized the album's musical direction and lyrical content, but criticized the lyrics of "Sit! Stay! Wait! Down!" for its sexual innuendos and references to doggy style; he deemed it "ridiculous" and said "if a guy sang this song, talking to a girl like she was a dog, people would be outraged. But since Namie is a female we're supposed to take it as some brilliant role reversal or otherwise be turned on by it? Sorry, I just found it slightly disturbing and extremely boring." Random J from his online blog commended the first single's title for sounding "ridiculously cool and straight to the point." However, he pointed out the song's composition by stating "It sounds like shit we've all heard before and the chorus just sounds like a droned out mess until "Sit! Stay! Wait! Down!" gets chanted." He also praised the track "Higher" for its "high energy" and having a "stronger melody", but criticized "Love Story" and "Arigatou" for being boring. He awarded three stars out of ten, highlighting "Higher" as the best song but said the EP was one of her weakest singles in her career.

Commercial response
Sit! Stay! Wait! Down!/Love Story charted as a single on the Oricon Singles Chart and peaked at number three. The EP stayed in the singles charts for twenty weeks, becoming Amuro's longest charting single since her 2008 EP 60s 70s 80s with twenty-one weeks. The single sold over 162,000 units in Japan, her highest selling single since 60s 70s 80s and remains her highest inside the 2010s era. Sit! Stay! Wait! Down!/Love Story was certified gold by the Recording Industry Association of Japan (RIAJ) for exceeding 100,000 shipments in Japan. "Love Story" and "Sit! Stay! Wait! Down!" charted at the Recochoku charts, peaking at number one and two respectively, making Amuro the first artist to have a double A-side single to do so.

Both "Sit! Stay! Wait! Down!" and "Love Story" individually on the Japan Hot 100 and the RIAJ Digital Track Chart. "Sit! Stay! Wait! Down!" peaked at number three on the Japan Hot 100 chart and sixteen on the Japan Hot Airplay Chart, while "Love Story" reached number two and seven respectively. Both songs peaked at number one on the RIAJ Digital Track Chart, making Amuro the first artist to have both double a-side singles reach the top spot. "Sit! Stay! Wait! Down!" was certified platinum by RIAJ for digital sales of 250,000 units; this tallied to total sales of 350,000 including the physical shipment. "Love Story" was certified million for cell phone ringtone and digital shipments of one million units; this tallied to total sales of 3.6 million units including the physical shipment. "Love Story" became Amuro's first million-selling single since her 2007 single "Baby Don't Cry".

"Love Story" received many forms of recognition: LISMO, an online music player provided by the cell phone company au, selected "Love Story" as the winner of LISMO Award; the karaoke company Daiichi Kosho announced that the song is the most popular Valentine's Day song for a female artist, along with Exile's "Lovers Again", while the song won "Song of the Year by Download" and second place for the Top 5 Downloaded songs at the annual 27th Japan Gold Disc Awards.

Music video
"Love Story" received a music video and was directed by Kensuke Kawamura. The video was shot in London and features scenes of Amuro walking down a street, sitting outside a cafe and inside a cafe. A teaser video was uploaded on Amuro's YouTube channel on March 18, 2012. The music video was featured on the DVD version of the single.

Track listing

Charts

Chart positions
"Stay! Stay! Wait! Down!"

"Love Story"

Certification

Notes

References

2011 singles
Japanese-language songs
Namie Amuro songs
Japanese television drama theme songs
RIAJ Digital Track Chart number-one singles